The Driggs Avenue station was a station on the demolished section of the BMT Jamaica Line in Brooklyn, New York City.

This station was opened on June 25, 1888 as the terminal of the Broadway elevated. When the line was extended to Broadway Ferry on July 14, 1888, this ceased to be the terminal. Mainline BMT Jamaica Line service began providing direct service to Manhattan via the Williamsburg Bridge after 1908. The station finally closed on July 3, 1916, but the segment of the line remained dormant throughout the 1920s and 1930s before being demolished.

This elevated station had two tracks and two side platforms.

References

External links
 Station Reporter—Broadway El

Defunct BMT Jamaica Line stations
1888 establishments in New York (state)
Railway stations in the United States opened in 1888
Railway stations closed in 1916
Former elevated and subway stations in Brooklyn
1916 disestablishments in New York (state)